Annagh or Anagh may refer to:

Places

Republic of Ireland
 Annagh, County Cavan, townland
 Annagh, townland in Kilkenny West civil parish, barony of Kilkenny West, County Westmeath, Republic of Ireland

Note: Nearly 30 other townlands in the Republic of Ireland bear the name Annagh

Northern Ireland
 Anagh (barony), County Londonderry, Northern Ireland; now called Tirkeeran

See also
 Enagh Lough, County Londonderry, Northern Ireland; pair of loughs